Parmouti 30 - Coptic calendar - Pashons 2

The first day of the Coptic month of Pashons, the ninth month of the Coptic year. In common years, this day corresponds to April 26, of the Julian Calendar, and May 9, of the Gregorian Calendar. This day falls in the Coptic Season of Shemu, the season of the Harvest.

Commemorations

Saints
The Nativity of the Blessed Virgin Mary, the Theotokos

References 

Days of the Coptic calendar